This article serves as an index – as complete as possible – of all the honorific orders or similar decorations awarded by the Netherlands, classified by Monarchies chapter and Republics chapter, and, under each chapter, recipients' countries and the detailed list of recipients.

Awards

Monarchies 
 European monarchies

Dutch Royal Family 
 King Willem-Alexander :  
 National orders :
 Grand Master of the Military William Order (Grand Master since 30 April 2013)
 Grand Master and Knight Grand Cross of the Order of the Netherlands Lion (K. Grand Cross, 27 April 1985; Grand Master since 30 April 2013)
 Grand Master of the Order of Orange-Nassau (Grand Master since 30 April 2013)
 House orders :
 Co-Grand Master and Knight of the Order of the Gold Lion of the House of Nassau (Kt, 30 April 1980; Grand Master since 30 April 2013)
 Grand Cross of the Order of the House of Orange (27 April 1967)
 Queen Máxima :  
  National orders : Knight Grand Cross of the Order of the Netherlands Lion
 Beatrix of the Netherlands :
 National orders :
 Knight Grand Cross of the Order of the Netherlands Lion (1956)
 House orders:
 Grand Master of the Order of the House of Orange (since 30 April 1980)
 Prince Constantijn of the Netherlands :
 National orders : Knight Grand Cross of the Order of the Netherlands Lion
 House orders : Knight of the Order of the Gold Lion of the House of Nassau (by birth)
 Princess Laurentien of the Netherlands :
 House orders : Grand Cross of the Order of the House of Orange
 Princess Margriet of the Netherlands :
 National orders : Knight Grand Cross of the Order of the Netherlands Lion
 House orders : Grand Cross of the Order of the House of Orange
 Pieter van Vollenhoven :
 National orders : Knight Grand Cross of the Order of the Netherlands Lion (29 April 2004)
 House orders : Grand Cross of the Order of the House of Orange (10 January 1967)
 Princess Irene of the Netherlands :
 National orders : Knight Grand Cross of the Order of the Netherlands Lion

Other orders
 Beatrix of the Netherlands :
 Patron of the Teutonic Order, Bailiwick of Utrecht
 Honorary Commander of the Order of Saint John in the Netherlands (19 June 1959)
 Willem-Alexander, Prince of Orange : Knight by Right of Order of Saint John in the Netherlands

Commonwealth realms' royal family 

 Queen Elizabeth II : Knight Grand Cross of the Order of the Netherlands Lion (1950)
 Charles, Prince of Wales :
 Grand Cross of the Order of the Crown (1972)
 Knight Grand Cross of the Order of Orange-Nassau (1982)
 Anne, Princess Royal : Grand Cross of the Order of the Crown (1972)

Norwegian Royal Family 

See also decorations pages (mark °) : Harald, Sonja, Haakon, Mette-Marit, Mârtha Louise, Astrid

 Harald V of Norway:
 Knight Grand Cross of the Order of the Netherlands Lion ° 
 Grand Cross of the Order of the Crown °
 Commander of the Order of the Golden Ark °
 Medal to commemorate the enthronement of Queen Beatrix °
 Queen Sonja of Norway:
 Knight Grand Cross of the Order of the Netherlands Lion ° 
 Grand Cross of the Order of the Crown° (1986)
 Medal to commemorate the enthronement of Queen Beatrix°
 Haakon, Crown Prince of Norway: Knight Grand Cross (with swords) of the Order of Orange-Nassau ° 
 Mette-Marit, Crown Princess of Norway: Knight Grand Cross of the Order of Orange-Nassau ° 
 Princess Märtha Louise of Norway: Grand Cross of the Order of the Crown° 
 Ari Behn: Grand Honorary Cross with Star of the Order of the Crown° 
 Princess Astrid of Norway: Grand Cross of the Order of the Crown°

Swedish Royal Family   

 Carl XVI Gustaf of Sweden : 
 Knight Grand Cross of the Order of the Netherlands Lion
 Grand Cross of the Order of the House of Orange
 Queen Silvia of Sweden : Knight Grand Cross of the Order of the Netherlands Lion

Danish Royal Family 
Official website pages (click on "Decorations") : Margrethe - Henrik - Frederik - Mary - Joachim - Marie - Benedikte

 Margrethe II of Denmark : Knight Grand Cross of the Order of the Netherlands Lion
 Frederik, Crown Prince of Denmark : Knight Grand Cross of the Order of the Netherlands Lion (17/03/2015)
 Mary, Crown Princess of Denmark : Knight Grand Cross of the Order of the Netherlands Lion (17/03/2015)
 Prince Joachim of Denmark : Knight Grand Cross of the Order of the Crown (17/03/2015)
 Princess Marie of Denmark : Knight Grand Cross of the Order of the Crown (17/03/2015)
 Princess Benedikte of Denmark : Knight Grand Cross of the Order of the Crown

Belgian Royal Family 

King & Queen's state visit in the Netherlands (04 - 06/04/2000)
State visit in Belgium of HM Queen Beatrix of Netherlands (20 - 22/06/2006).

 King Philippe : 
 Knight Grand Cross of the Order of Orange-Nassau (1993) 
 Knight of the Order of the Gold Lion of the House of Nassau (common to both branches of Nassau, see Luxembourg)
 Queen Mathilde : Knight Grand Cross of the Order of Orange-Nassau (2006)  
 King Albert II :
 Knight Grand Cross of the Order of the Netherlands Lion
 Knight Grand Cross of the Order of Orange-Nassau
 Knight of the Order of the Gold Lion of the House of Nassau (common to both branches of Nassau, see Luxembourg)
 Queen Paola :
 Knight Grand Cross of the Order of the Netherlands Lion 
 Knight of the Order of the Gold Lion of the House of Nassau (common to both branches of Nassau, see Luxembourg)
 Princess Astrid of Belgium, Archduchess of Austria-Este : Grand Cross of the Order of the Crown (2006) 
 Prince Lorenz of Belgium, Archduke of Austria-Este : Grand Cross of the Order of the Crown (2006)
 Prince Laurent of Belgium: Grand Cross of the Order of the Crown (2006)
 Princess Claire : Grand Cross of the Order of the Crown (2006)

Luxembourgish Grand-Ducal Family 

 Henri, Grand Duke of Luxembourg : Knight Grand Cross of the Order of the Netherlands Lion
 Maria Teresa, Grand Duchess of Luxembourg : Knight Grand Cross of the Order of the Netherlands Lion
 Guillaume, Hereditary Grand Duke of Luxembourg : Knight Grand Cross of the Order of Orange-Nassau (2012)

Spanish Royal Family 

 Juan Carlos I of Spain : Knight Grand Cross of the Order of the Netherlands Lion
 Queen Sofía of Spain : Knight Grand Cross of the Order of the Netherlands Lion
 Felipe, Prince of Asturias : Knight Grand Cross of the Order of Orange-Nassau 
 Infanta Elena, Duchess of Lugo : Knight Grand Cross of the Order of Orange-Nassau (1985)
 Infanta Cristina, Duchess of Palma de Mallorca : Knight Grand Cross of the Order of Orange-Nassau (1985)

 Asian monarchies

Jordanian Royal Family 

 Abdullah II of Jordan  : 
 Knight Grand Cross of the Order of the Netherlands Lion 
 Grand Cross of Order of the House of Orange (7 December 1994) 
 Queen Rania of Jordan : Knight Grand Cross of the Order of the Netherlands Lion 
 Prince Hamzah bin Al Hussein, son of Queen Noor of Jordan, half-brother of Abdullah II of Jordan : Knight Grand Cross of the Order of Orange-Nassau (30 October 2006)
 Princess Noor Hamzah, Prince Hamzah's wife : Knight Grand Cross of the Order of Orange-Nassau (30 October 2006) 
 Prince Hassan bin Talal, youngest brother of King Hussein I of Jordan : Knight Grand Cross of the Order of Orange-Nassau 
 Princess Sarvath El Hassan, Hassan's wife : Knight Grand Cross of the Order of Orange-Nassau 
 Princess Rahma bint El Hassan, Hassan's elder daughter : Knight Grand Cross of the Order of Orange-Nassau (30 October 2006)
 Mr. Ala'a Al Batayneh, Princess Rahma's husband : Knight Grand Cross of the Order of Orange-Nassau (30 October 2006)

Thai Royal Family 

 Queen Sirikit of Thailand : Knight Grand Cross of the Order of the Netherlands Lion (1960)
 Princess Sirindhorn of Thailand : Grand Cross of the Order of the Crown (2003) 
 Princess Chulabhorn Walailak of Thailand :  Knight Grand Cross of the Order of Orange-Nassau (2003)

Japanese Imperial Family 

 Emperor Akihito : Knight Grand Cross of the Order of the Netherlands Lion
 Empress Michiko : Knight Grand Cross of the Order of the Netherlands Lion (1991)
 Crown Prince Naruhito : Grand Cross of the Order of the Crown

See also 
 Mirror page : List of honours of the Dutch Royal Family by country

References 

 
Netherlands